The Council for Economic Education (the new name, since 2009 January, of the National Council on Economic Education) is an organization in the United States that focuses on the economic and financial education of students from kindergarten through high school.

The mission of the Council for Economic Education is to instill in young people the fourth “R”—a real-world understanding of economics and personal finance. It is only by acquiring economic and financial literacy that children can learn that there are better options for a life well lived, will be able to see opportunity on their horizon line and, ultimately, can grow into successful and productive adults capable of making informed and responsible decisions.

Headquartered in New York City, CEE provides classroom resources to K-12 teachers and students, free professional development to educators, webinars, standards and assessment tools, and guidance for advocacy and outreach.

Campaign for Economic Literacy
The Council for Economic Education is working on a campaign to increase economic literacy.

Classroom Reach
It was reported in 2013 that five million K-12 students annually used the Council for Economic Education's personal-finance and economics education.

Council for Economic Education’s (CEE) Survey of the States
The Council for Economic Education measures through a biennial survey financial literacy education across the United States by state.

Voluntary National Content Standards in Economics

National Content Standards in Personal Finance
The Council for Economic Education released its National Content Standards in Personal Finance in March 2013 that are a personal finance course for high.

Annual Financial Literacy and Economic Education Conference
The Annual Conference is a nationwide meeting of K–12 educators, CEE affiliates from across the country, Federal Reserve partners, and other educators in this field. The conference features a selection of professional development workshops on economic and financial literacy geared for elementary, middle and high school levels. Topics include pedagogy and resources, curriculum strategy for schools/school districts, teaching strategies, assessment and research, new programs and best practices. In addition to the workshops, speakers address current economic and financial topics to enable educators to bring these perspectives back to their classrooms. The conference also features roundtable sessions led by master teachers to discuss shared issues and successes, and informal opportunities for networking.

National Personal Finance Challenge
The National Personal Finance Challenge (NPFC) is a high school and middle school Personal Finance competition. Each year, over 18,000 students across the U.S. participate in the competition. The Challenge provides students with an exciting and motivating opportunity to build, apply and showcase their knowledge of finance. It also provides teachers with the opportunity to give their students essential tools to create financial stability and economic opportunity.

Students across the country compete on the state level, with state winners advancing to the National Finals. Teams of four students answer rigorous questions on Personal Finance and current events. At the National Final level, students are given a detailed fictitious family scenario and two hours to prepare a financial plan for the family. They then present their plan to a panel of expert judges. Teams are judged on content knowledge, team work, and presentation skills, in order to earn the title of National Personal Finance Challenge Champions.

National Economics Challenge
The National Economics Challenge (NEC) is a high school economics competition. Each year, over 11,000 students across the U.S. participate in the competition. The Challenge recognizes exceptional high school students for their knowledge of economic principles and their ability to apply problem-solving and critical-thinking skills to real-world events.

The National Economics Challenge is the only national competition of its kind, with students showcasing their knowledge of economics in a fun, challenging, and rewarding contest. The competition begins at the state level, with state champions advancing to the National Semi-Final round and the top performers subsequently advancing to the National Final round, which is held in New York City. Teams of four students answer rigorous questions on microeconomics, macroeconomics, international economics, and current events. At the National Final level, students complete rounds of multiple choice testing, work in teams to solve critical thinking case problems, and participate in a quick-paced oral quiz bowl in order to earn the title of National Economics Challenge Champions.

The National Economics Challenge offers a two-division contest format based on students’ economics coursework. The Adam Smith division is designed for students who are enrolled in Advanced Placement, international baccalaureate and honors economics courses. The David Ricardo division is fashioned for students who have received a general economics education, typically of one semester or less. The two-division system provides high school students of varying levels of economics practice with the chance to compete against their peers.

The Council for Economic Education sponsors the National Economics Challenge.

History

Sponsors
The following is a partial list of donors to the Campaign for Economic Literacy.  Each has donated at least 100,000 US Dollars to the Campaign.

Other past contributors:

 Ariel Investments, LLC
 Caterpillar Foundation
 Charles Schwab Foundation
 Citigroup Foundation
 Dillon Foundation, Inc.
 Edward Jones
 FedEx Services
 Ford Motor Company Fund
 JA Japan
 JP Morgan Chase & Co.
 Kraft Foods, Inc.
 McDonald's USA
 Mentor Press LLC
 NYSE Group
 Univision Radio

References

External links
 Council for Economic Education homepage

Educational organizations based in the United States
Economics education